Oil Strike North is a BBC television drama series produced in 1975.

The series was created and produced by Gerard Glaister and dealt with life on Nelson One, a North Sea oil rig owned by the fictional company Triumph Oil. Eschewing the corporate power struggles of Mogul / The Troubleshooters and concentrating on more personal storylines, Oil Strike North was essentially a character study of how workers faced life on the rig and the impact it had on the lives of their families and loved ones.

Oil Strike North lasted for one series of thirteen episodes. Gerard Glaister later moved on to produce the Second World War resistance drama Secret Army, the air freight series Buccaneer and then onto the boating soap serial Howards' Way. Two of the leading actors in Oil Strike North, Nigel Davenport and Glyn Owen, also later appeared in Howards' Way.

The scenario was later revived by the BBC for the mid-1990s drama Roughnecks.

Cast

 Nigel Davenport - Jim Fraser
 Glyn Owen - Jack Mullery
 Barbara Shelley - Elaine Smythe
 Angela Douglas - Julie Ward
 Michael Witney - Frank Ward
 Calum Mill - Angus Gallacher
 Angela Cheyne - Shona Campbell
 Andrew Robertson - Donald Cameron
 Richard Hurndall - Charles Wayman
 Sean Caffrey - Evans
 Maurice Roëves - McGraw

Episodes
"Deadline"
"Quiet Day"
"Storm Clouds"
"First Lion"
"The Decision"
"The Floating Bomb"
"It Depends Where You Stand"
"Shore Leave"
"Workhorse"
"Time of Hazard"
"Headhunters"
"The Fatal Hours (part 1)"
"The Fatal Hours (part 2)"

References

External links
 

BBC television dramas
1975 British television series debuts
1975 British television series endings
1970s British drama television series
English-language television shows
Television series by 20th Century Fox Television